John Blake (born August 1, 1960) is an American politician from Pennsylvania, United States, who served as a Democratic member of the Pennsylvania State Senate for the 22nd District from 2011 to 2021. He is currently the District Director and Senior Economic Development Specialist for Congressman Matt Cartwright.

Early life and education
Blake received a bachelor's degree from Villanova University while playing on the school's football team. He also received a master's in social work from Marywood College and a master's in business administration from the University of Scranton.

He also completed Executive Education in Public Management at Harvard University's John F. Kennedy School of Government.

Career
Blake began working in housing policy as director of the Lackawanna County Redevelopment Authority. Prior to entering electoral politics, he also held a two-year fellowship position under the U.S Department of Housing and Urban Development, a job as vice president for community development with PNC Bank, and an appointment as the Ed Rendell administration's director of policy for Northeastern Pennsylvania.

On February 15, 2021, Blake resigned from the Pennsylvania Senate to take a position leading economic development from Congressman Matt Cartwright.

References

External links 
Senator John Blake official caucus website
Pennsylvania State Senate - John Blake (D) official PA Senate website
John Blake for Senate official campaign website

1960 births
21st-century American politicians
Harvard Kennedy School alumni
Living people
Marywood University alumni
Democratic Party members of the Pennsylvania House of Representatives
Democratic Party Pennsylvania state senators
Politicians from Scranton, Pennsylvania
University of Scranton alumni
Villanova University alumni